Rear Admiral John Adams (February 1798 – 17 December 1866) was a senior Royal Navy officer who served as Commander-in-Chief, Africa from 1854 to 1857.

Naval career
Adams joined the Royal Navy on 8 June 1806. Promoted to captain on 18 December 1843, he was given command of the frigate, in 1850 and went on to serve as Commander-in-Chief, Africa from 1854 to 1857.

He married Mary Anne Gerard in 1838. After she died in 1843, he married Elizabeth Hurst in 1846.

References

Royal Navy rear admirals
1798 births
1866 deaths